Guilderland High School is a public senior high school, located in Guilderland Center, New York.  It is part of the Guilderland Central School District.  Constructed in 1953, the high school has since undergone additions in 1955, 1960, 1997, 2010, and 2021.  Originally, the building functioned as a Junior-Senior High School, but after the construction of Farnsworth Middle School in 1970, the district divided the schools into two. As a school, Guilderland High School's enrollment jurisdiction also includes the village of Altamont, NY and the North Bethlehem neighborhood of Bethlehem, NY.

Currently, the school runs on block scheduling.

Course levels 

Guilderland High School boasts a variety of different course levels and types to accommodate the different needs of students.  Types include Advanced Placement, SUPA (Syracuse University Project Advance), Honors, Regents, Core, Focus, Vo-Tech, ESL, as well as various additional college programs. This school also is included in the Project Lead The Way course (PLTW) along with other schools in the United States.

Courses in advanced study 

Guilderland High School offers numerous opportunities for students to take Advanced Placement examinations, as well as place a year ahead in various courses.  Advanced course standing may first be attained when a student is in eighth grade.

Accelerated foreign language study is available for students in French and Spanish during a student's freshman year.  The "2A" course selection allows for two years of study condensed into one year.  Therefore, a student is able to progress from "French 2A" directly to "French 4." Effectively the acceleration allows for a one-year advancement in foreign language study.

Additionally, Guilderland High School offers numerous Advanced Placement courses to its students. Decision to enroll in AP courses is at the discretion of the student and his or her guidance counselor, though teacher recommendations may also be influential.  At present, AP courses available to GHS students include European History, American History, English Language, English Literature, Calculus AB, Calculus BC, Chemistry, Music Theory, Studio Art, US Government and Politics, Physics, and Computer Science, but students have been known to take the Microeconomics, Macroeconomics, Biology, Statistics, Psychology, and Human Geography exams after self-preparation and/or preparation in non-AP classes.

The Guilderland Players 

Guilderland High School is also known for its theatre program.  The group, called the Guilderland Players, was organized in the 1968-69 school year by English teacher Bob Scrafford, but did not put on their first performance, Bye Bye Birdie, until the next year. Musicals were directed for many years by the inimitable Fred Heitkamp. Producing two shows each year, a drama in the fall and a musical in the spring, the Guilderland Players, known as 'GP' by its members, is one of the largest extracurricular activities at Guilderland High School, including more than one hundred students in its cast, stage crew, and pit. It is staffed by John Fatuzzo (Pit Conductor), Claudia Golub (music director), and Andy Maycock (director). The Guilderland Players' 2006 production of Steel Pier won the SLOC Award for 'Best Choreography.' Various alumni of the Guilderland Players have also gone on to other acting opportunities, including appearing on the TV show American Dreams, the Original Broadway Cast of La Bohème, and in the cast of multiple seasons of Park Playhouse.
Lyle E Warner, English teacher, also directed plays 1971-1973, one I remember was Lost Horizons.

Music 

Guilderland High School is home to an award-winning music department. Consisting of six credit-bearing ensembles and four extracurricular ensembles, the department holds many concerts a year in addition to participating in other events or area concerts.

The Concert Orchestra and Symphony Orchestra are directed by Susan Curro.  She also directs the Chamber Strings, an extracurricular ensemble consisting of approximately 15 string players, with occasional guest winds, including many players in the Empire State Youth and Repertory Orchestras.  The orchestra was featured on WMHT's Music for the Holidays program in 2004.  The Wind Ensemble is directed by Kathleen Richards Ehlinger. Ehlinger, a trumpetist for the Tri City Brass Quintet, is a graduate of the Crane School of Music in Potsdam, New York and George Mason University in Fairfax, Virginia. She also directs the Guilderland Town Band during the summer and is an active clinician throughout the state. The Wind Ensemble, traveled to Annapolis, Maryland in April 2007 for a music festival and received the award for best instrumental group.  The oboe section also received the best section award.  In addition, the ensemble received a rating of Gold with Distinction at its NYSSMA evaluation in 2007 and 2008. Symphonic Band and the extracurricular  Jazz Band are directed by John Fatuzzo, a recent graduate of the Crane School of Music.  Jazz Band is composed of many members of the Empire State Jazz Ensembles.

The Women's Choir and Concert Choir are directed by Claudia Golub. Golub also conducts the extracurricular Chamber Choir, a select group of 16-24 singers. In December 2006, the Chamber Choir performed at the NYSSMA Convention in Rochester, NY. In March 2007, the ensemble won the New York State High School A Cappella Championship.  They have also appeared at the Albany Pro Musica High School Choral Festival and on WMHT's Music for the Holidays.  The  Mixed Choir is conducted by Shannon deFrancqueville.  The Mixed Choir, with the Women's Choir, performed at the State Capitol as part of Music in Our Schools Month in 2007. 

The music department also offers AP Music Theory, Music Theory I, Music Technology I and II, and  Music in Our Lives, as courses for credit.  Students also have the option of taking Applied Music, whether they are members of the music department or not.  Credit can be received for regular private music lessons and regular practice, with occasional performance examinations.

Extracurricular activities

Student media 

The school has an award-winning student newspaper named The Journal, which is published seven times in the school year.  The school's Media Club produces a live televised news program The GHS Reporter that runs at the start of homeroom prior to the televised announcements, replays on Time Warner Cable Educational-access television cable TV Channel 16 in Guilderland, and is available to view in the Media's YouTube channel here where you can view livestreams of athletic events, Board of Education meetings, graduations, concerts, informational meetings like Admissions nights, feature segments in the GHS Reporter, skits, and the GHS Reporter itself.
The GHS Reporter covers many stories each show, such as the ones seen here  and here.

In the 2005-2006 school year, the GHS Reporter won an award in New York City for a production titled "Motivation" that was produced during the 2004-2005 and 2005-2006 school years.  The video was centered on the club's trip to New York City and the various news packages produced.  Three packages were made: Fleet Week, Safety and Security, and the Impact of 9/11 on Surrounding Businesses. Students from the Guilderland High School Media Club as well as the student newspaper The Journal participated.

Guilderland High School also features the yearly "Graffiti" Literary Magazine, run by students to publish poems, stories, and other literary works.

The Journal has won numerous student journalism awards. The newspaper commonly receives multiple awards at the Empire State Student Press Association's annual convention, including awards for Best Overall Newspaper, Best Design and individual writing, design, photography and graphics awards. The Journal was awarded Best Overall Newspaper by the New York State Press Association in the high school newspaper category in 2005 Better Newspaper Contest, in addition to a Best Design award and individual awards for writing.

Student government 

The student body of Guilderland High School is represented by the GHS Student Government, a group of elected and appointed officers and volunteers who serve both to serve as a link between the student body and administration, and also to improve student life by hosting events and aiding clubs among other duties.

Sports 
Guilderland's athletes are known as the Flying Dutchmen. The district offers 19 sports at all levels.  Guilderland is home to one of the top cross-country programs in the Northeast, a strong tennis program, a skilled boys' soccer team that won the Class A State Championship in 1989, the 2006, 2007 and 2008 co-ed cheerleading national champions, the 2007 New York State Section II Class A Girls' lacrosse team and New York State's 2007 section 2 class AA champion baseball team.  In 2007, the baseball team won its first title since the 1970s and the girls' lacrosse team ended Bethlehem High School's run of eight titles to win their first ever Section II and Suburban Council Title. Also in 2008, the football team became the first in school history to make it to the Section II Class AA Finals, while the boys' lacrosse team competed in the Suburban Council final.  That same year, the girls' cross country team attended the prestigious Federation Cross Country Meet for the first time since 1999, where they placed tenth out of 28 teams. The 2008 girls' lacrosse team repeated what it had accomplished in 2007 by winning back to back Suburban Council and Section II Championships.  It went on to become Regional Champions that year after defeating Lakeland-Panas High school and Kingston high school. The 2008 boys' soccer team went undefeated with 22 wins (the most in school history) on their way to their first Section II championship since 1997. They were also ranked 15th on ESPN's list of Top 50 Boys' Soccer Teams. In 2005, the boys' Tennis team went 16-0 and won the Suburban Council Championship over Bethlehem High School, and in 2011, the boys' tennis Team went 11-3 and won the Suburban Council Championship over Bethlehem Highschool.  In 2009 the Wrestling team placed 3rd in the Section II State Qualifier.  They also had six wrestlers place in Section II.  In 2010 one of the senior captains was featured as WNYT's High School Player of the Week.

Each Year the graduating class of Guilderland High School collects a "Senior Superlative" survey to be presented in the yearbook. Superlatives include Best Friends, Best Smile, Easiest to talk to, Best Laugh, etc.

Clubs and organizations 

Guilderland High School sponsors dozens of student-organizations, each advised and supervised by a teacher who may participate in the club's activities. They include but are not limited to:

Alliance, Best Buddies, Chess Club, S.T.A.T.I.C. (Christian Fellowship), Debate Club, English Club, Environmental Club, Future Business Leaders of America (FBLA), Free the Children, German Club, Graffiti - Literary Magazine, the Guilderland Players, International Club/Cultural Fair, Jewish Student Union (JSU) Journal Newspaper, Key Club International,  Math League, Masterminds, Media Club, Medical Club (Club Med), Model United Nations, Music Council, National Honor Society, Natural Helpers, Peer Network, Philosophy Club, Ski Club, Students Against Destructive Decisions (SADD), Students for Improving Health Care (SIHC), Student Government, Students/Teachers Against Racism (STAR), Students Environmental Action Coalition, Travel Club, Tri-M Music Honor Society, Young Democrats of America, Yearbook - Tawasenthan, and Youth Ending Hunger.

The school's Math League is a member of the New York Math League, a contest consisting of six timed exams administered throughout every academic year. Since 2005, the Guilderland team has come first in the region and, in 2008, placed 10th in the region.

GreatSchools.org rating 

In 2009, GHS earned a 6 out of 10 rating according to metrics measured by the website GreatSchools.org.  Though the school continues to achieve parity in state testing scores relative to other high schools across the state of NY, only 50% of the students passed the Mathematics A examination in 2009, which led to the school's diminished rating.

In 2018, GHS earned an 8 out of 10 rating according to metrics measured by the website GreatSchools.org. The school is above average in academics receiving a 10/10 in college readiness. Where the school loses points is its equity overview.

Notable alumni
Kristin Russo, 1998 - American speaker, personality, and LGBTQ activist
 Harold J. Greene, 1977 - Major General, US Army-General Officer killed in Combat August 5, 2014
 Clancy Newman, 1995 - cellist and composer
 Lidiya Yankovskaya, 2004 - Conductor - Orli and Bill Staley Music Director, Chicago Opera Theater

References

External links 
 Guilderland High School
 GreatSchools.org

1953 establishments in New York (state)
Educational institutions established in 1953
Guilderland, New York
Public high schools in Albany County, New York